United Nations Security Council Resolution 2057 was unanimously adopted on 5 July 2012. It extended the mission of the United Nations Mission in South Sudan for an additional year.

See also 
List of United Nations Security Council Resolutions 2001 to 2100

References

External links
Text of the Resolution at undocs.org

2012 United Nations Security Council resolutions
United Nations Security Council resolutions concerning Sudan
2012 in Sudan
July 2012 events